The following is a list of episodes for the American reality series, The City.

Series overview

Episodes

Season 1 (2008–09)

Season 2 (2010)

References

Lists of reality television series episodes